The Love Cats may refer to:

 "The Love Cats" (song), a 1983 song by The Cure
 The Love Cats (film), a 2012 American drama film
 The Lovecats, a project of Peruvian musician Pelo Madueño